Mariano Rigillo (born 12 September 1939) is an Italian actor.

Biography
In the 1960s, Rigillo attended the Silvio d'Amico National Academy of Dramatic Arts and began his career on stage playing roles in plays by William Shakespeare, Carlo Goldoni, Bertolt Brecht and Luigi Pirandello, and in those years he met Giuseppe Patroni Griffi with whom he has worked on numerous occasions.

In addition to his career as a theatrical, cinematographic and television actor, Rigillo also worked as a voice actor, giving his voice to Harvey Keitel in Camorra, Ben Gazzara in Il camorrista and Geoffrey Rush in Elizabeth and Elizabeth: The Golden Age.

Selected filmography

 Metti, una sera a cena (1969) - Comedian
 Metello (1970) - Olindo Tinai
 Chronicle of a Homicide (1972) - Luca Binda
 Bronte: cronaca di un massacro che i libri di storia non hanno raccontato (1972) - Nino Bixio
 The Infamous Column (1972)
 Soldier of Fortune (1976) - Albimonte da Peretola
 The Black Corsair (1976)
 Arrivano i bersaglieri (1980) - La Marmora
 Il camorrista (1986) - Il Professore (voice)
 Regina (1987)
 Il Postino: The Postman (1994) - Di Cosimo
 Passaggio per il paradiso (1998) - Lorenzo
 La strategia della maschera (1998) - Windisch-Roth
 Un affare trasversale (1998)
 Per tutto il tempo che ci resta (1998) - Michele Galvano
 A Respectable Man (1999) - Giudice Istruttore Giorgio Fontana
 Sottovento! (2001) - Il professore
 Te lo leggo negli occhi (2004) - Longone
 E ridendo l'uccise (2005) - Boschetti
 The Lark Farm (2007) - Assadour
 Flying Lessons (2007) - Rabbino
 Prova a volare (2007)
 Un amore di Gide (2008) - Gesuino
 Marcello Marcello (2008) - Mayor Del Ponte
 Per Sofia (2009) - Riccardo, padre Isak
 Sorry If I Want to Marry You (2010) - Padre di Alex
 Anna, Teresa e le resistenti (2010)
 Box Office 3D: The Filmest of Films (2011) - Officiante (segment "Il Codice Teomondo Scrofalo")
 To Rome with Love (2012) - Anna's Client
 100 metri dal paradiso (2012)
 Malanapoli - la ventunesima stella (2013)
 Andiamo a quel paese (2014) - Padre Benedetto
 Leone nel basilico (2014) - Renato
 Oscar (2016) - Oscar ( old )
 Cinderella the Cat (2017) - Renato
 Edhel (2017) - Ermete
 Gatta Cenerentola (2017) - Vittorio Basile (voice)
 Solo no (2019)
 Gli anni più belli (2020) - The lawyer
Like a Cat on a Highway 2 (2021)

References

External links
 

1939 births
Living people
Male actors from Naples
Italian male film actors
20th-century Italian male actors
21st-century Italian male actors